Lawrence onochie (born 10 August 1969) is a Nigerian pastor, author, public speaker and scholar and a spiritual leader. He is the lead pastor of The Kings Heritage Church, Nigeria. In 2016, he became a media sensation when he disguised as a beggar to his church in Nigeria just to teach his members about Gods love in Christmas.

Background and Academic Records 
Born on August 10, 1969, Onochie is from Ubulu ukwu, Delta State, located in the South-South part of Nigeria. Onochie grew up in Lagos, where he attended Oshodi Comprehensive High School, Lagos State, Nigeria from 1981–1985 and Federal School of arts and science between 1986-1987 . In 1988, he was admitted into the Enugu State University of Science and Technology, Enugu State where he graduated in 1993.

Pastoral Ministry 
He became born again in 1987 through the ministry of Bishop Mike Okonkwo at The Redeemed Evangelical Mission church after a delinquent lifestyle. In 1988, he pastored a fellowship called ‘The Royal Priesthood Family’ and further went on to become a pastor of ‘Youths Aflame Christian Outreach’ (YACO), a revolutionary youth ministry which was an amalgamation of three different youth ministries between 1989-1991. Between 1991-1993 he also served as the Pastor of ‘El-shaddai Club’, a campus fellowship in Anambra State University of Science and Technology.

In 1994, Lawrence Onochie served in the birthing process of House On The Rock Church, where he served in different capacities over a period of seven (7) years. At House On The Rock Church, he held various pastoral positions, which included Pastor in charge of the Music Ministry, Coordinator PETRA Coalition, Director of Counseling and Director of Missions.

On 11 November 2001, the General Overseer of The Redeem Evangelical Church, Bishop Mike Okonkwo, commissioned The Kings Heritage Church, of which Lawrence Onochie has since been its Senior pastor. Apart from his desire for winning souls, Lawrence is passionate about the role of youths in the positive transformation of Nigeria, and Africa in general. His mandate has always been to 'bring people from the back side to the front side' and for them to unleash their undiscovered potentials. 

He is the convener of Discovery For Youths, a youths Empowerment  initiative held annually, which is "focused on  raising a new breed of dynamic young leaders in Nigeria.

Bibliography 
Lawrence has published several books, which include the following:
 Against all odds
 Radical Grace
 Economic Empowerment
 Beyond the limits

Personal life 
Lawrence Onochie is married to Josephine the AGO (Assistant general overseer) of the King's Heritage Church, President of Covenant Women Ministry International and a minister of the gospel. Together, they live in Lagos with their son Daniel.

References

External links 
 [1] The Kings Heritage Official Website

1969 births
Living people
Nigerian Pentecostal pastors
Nigerian Christian writers
People from Delta State
Residents of Lagos
Converts to evangelical Christianity from Roman Catholicism